The 1888 Missouri gubernatorial election was held on November 6, 1888 and resulted in a victory for the Democratic nominee, Mayor of St. Louis David R. Francis, over the Republican candidate Elbert E. Kimball, Union Labor candidate Ahira Manring, and Prohibition candidate Frank M. Lowe.

Results

References

Missouri
1888
Gubernatorial
November 1888 events